Du Qiong; ca. 1396-1474 was a Chinese landscape painter, calligrapher and poet during the Ming dynasty (1368–1644).

Du was born in Suzhou, Jiangsu province and was a distant ancestor of Dong Yuan. His style name was 'Using Excellence" (Yongjia, 用嘉) and his pseudonyms were 'Tiller of the Eastern Plaines" (Dongyuan gengzhe, 东原耕者) and 'Luguan Daoist' (Luguan daoren, 鹿冠道人). Du's style was distinctive though somewhat similar to that of Wang Meng. He often used a dry brush and light quantities of ink to achieve his effects. He was teacher to Shen Zhou.

Notes

References
 Ci hai bian ji wei yuan hui. Ci hai . Shanghai: Shanghai ci shu chu ban she , 1979.

1396 births
1474 deaths
Ming dynasty landscape painters
Painters from Suzhou
Ming dynasty calligraphers
Ming dynasty poets
Writers from Suzhou
Poets from Jiangsu
15th-century Chinese poets
15th-century Chinese calligraphers